Gravilias is a district of the Desamparados canton, in the San José province of Costa Rica.

Toponymy
The district's name comes from the Grevillea robusta species of tree, widely used to provide shadow to coffee plantations.

History 
Gravilias was created on 23 November 1992 by Decreto Ejecutivo 21752-G.

Geography 
Gravilias has an area of  km2 and an elevation of  metres.

Demographics 

For the 2011 census, Gravilias had a population of  inhabitants.

References 

Districts of San José Province
Populated places in San José Province